1909 in sports describes the year's events in world sport.

American football
College championship
 College football national championship – Yale Bulldogs

Association football
International football
 West Auckland Town, an English amateur team, defeats FC Winterthur of Switzerland 2–0 to win the Sir Thomas Lipton Trophy, one of the earliest international club competitions
Brazil
 4 April — Sport Club Internacional is founded in Porto Alegre
 12 October - Coritiba Foot Ball Club is founded in Curitiba
England
 The Football League – Newcastle United 53 points, Everton 46, Sunderland 44, Blackburn Rovers 41, The Wednesday 40, Woolwich Arsenal 38
 FA Cup final – Manchester United 1–0 Bristol City at Crystal Palace, London
Germany
 National Championship – Phönix Karlsruhe 4–2 Viktoria Berlin at Breslau 
Hungary
 Budapest Honvéd FC founded on August 3.
Romania
 Formation of the Romanian Football Federation (Federaţia Română de Fotbal or FRF)
Scotland
 Scottish Football League – Celtic
 Scottish Cup final – competition cancelled following a riot at a replay between Rangers and Celtic; the first match was drawn 2–2 and the replay ended 1–1
Spain
 Formation of the Royal Spanish Football Federation (Real Federación Española de Fútbol or RFEF). It is originally known as the Federación Española de Clubs de Football.
 Real Sociedad was founded in San Sebastián on September 7.

Athletics
 February 12 - American athlete James Clark runs world record Marathon (2:46:52.6) in New York City at the Brooklyn Marathon
 May 8 -  American long-distance runner Albert Raines set a world's best time in the marathon ( 2:46:04) at the Bronx Marathon
 August 23 - Fred ‘Tenby’ Davies (Wales) defeats Bert Day (Ireland) at Pontypridd to become world champion over the half-mile distance run.

Australian rules football
VFL Premiership
 South Melbourne wins the 13th VFL Premiership: South Melbourne 4.14 (38) d Carlton 4.12 (36) at Melbourne Cricket Ground (MCG)

Bandy
Sweden
 Championship final – AIK 7–3 Djurgårdens IF

Baseball
World Series
 8–16 October — Pittsburgh Pirates (NL) defeats Detroit Tigers (AL) to win the 1909 World Series by 4 games to 3

Boxing
Events
 March 10 - Jack Johnson fights Victor McLaglen to no decision in 6 rounds (Exhibition fight at the Vancouver Athletic Club)
 June 19 — Monte Attell wins the World Bantamweight Championship joining his brother Abe Attell, who holds the World Featherweight Championship, as the first pair of brothers to hold world titles simultaneously.
Lineal world champions
 World Heavyweight Championship – Jack Johnson
 World Light Heavyweight Championship – vacant
 World Middleweight Championship – Stanley Ketchel
 World Welterweight Championship – vacant
 World Lightweight Championship – Battling Nelson
 World Featherweight Championship – Abe Attell
 World Bantamweight Championship – Jimmy Walsh → "Fighting" Jimmy Reagan → Monte Attell

Canadian football
Grey Cup
 4 December — 1st Grey Cup – University of Toronto Varsity Blues 26–6 Toronto Parkdale Canoe Club.

Cricket
Events
 15 June — representatives of England, Australia and South Africa meet at Lord's to form the Imperial Cricket Conference (ICC)
England
 County Championship – Kent  
 Minor Counties Championship – Wiltshire
 Most runs – Ernie Hayes 2105 @ 36.29 (HS 276)
 Most wickets – Colin Blythe 215 @ 14.54 (BB 9–42)
 Wisden Cricketers of the Year – Warren Bardsley, Sydney Barnes, Douglas Carr, Arthur Day, Vernon Ransford
Australia
 Sheffield Shield – New South Wales 
 Most runs – Vernon Ransford 825 @ 103.12 (HS 182)
 Most wickets – Jack O'Connor 40 @ 23.00 (BB 7–36)
India
 Bombay Triangular – Europeans
New Zealand
 Plunket Shield – Auckland
South Africa
 Currie Cup – not contested
West Indies
 Inter-Colonial Tournament – Barbados

Cycling
Tour de France
 François Faber (Luxembourg) wins the 7th Tour de France
Giro d'Italia
 Luigi Ganna (Italy) wins the inaugural Giro d'Italia

Eton wall game
Events
 30 November — a goal is scored in the St. Andrew's Day match at Eton College, the last time this has happened in the St. Andrew's Day game (the most important match of the year) though points have been scored by other methods

Figure skating
World Figure Skating Championships
 World Men's Champion – Ulrich Salchow (Sweden)
 World Women's Champion – Lily Kronberger (Hungary) 
 World Pairs Champions – Phyllis Johnson and James H. Johnson (Great Britain)

Golf
Major tournaments
 British Open – John Henry Taylor
 U.S. Open – George Sargent
Other tournaments
 British Amateur – Robert Maxwell 
 US Amateur – Robert A. Gardner

Horse racing
England
 Grand National – Lutteur III
 1,000 Guineas Stakes – Electra
 2,000 Guineas Stakes – Minoru
 The Derby – Minoru
 The Oaks – Perola
 St. Leger Stakes – Bayardo
Australia
 Melbourne Cup – Prince Foote
Canada
 King's Plate – Shimonese
Ireland
 Irish Grand National – Little Hack II
 Irish Derby Stakes – Bachelor's Double
USA
 Kentucky Derby – Wintergreen 
 Preakness Stakes – Effendi
 Belmont Stakes – Joe Madden

Ice hockey
Stanley Cup
 March — Ottawa Hockey Club wins the Eastern Canada Hockey Association (ECHA) championship and the Stanley Cup.
 March — Renfrew Creamery Kings win the Federal Hockey League championship and challenge for the Stanley Cup, but cannot play because the Stanley Cup trustees rule their players are ineligible.
Amateur hockey
 February — the Allan Cup is donated to be the amateur championship hockey trophy of Canada
 March — Ottawa Cliffsides win the Inter-Provincial Amateur Hockey Union (IPAHU) and the Allan Cup. The Cliffsides then lose a challenge to Queen's College of Kingston, Ontario.
Professional hockey
 25 November — Eastern Canada Hockey Association (ECHA) disbands over the plans of the Montreal Wanderers to change rinks. The Wanderers are shut out and the new Canadian Hockey Association (CHA) is formed with the remainder of the ECHA teams. The CHA will disband in January 1910.
 2 December — The Montreal Wanderers form the National Hockey Association (NHA) with the Renfrew Creamery Kings, Cobalt Silver Kings and Haileybury Comets of the Temiscaming league. The NHA owners also organize a new team Les Canadiens which is the basis of today's Montreal Canadiens. The NHA will absorb Ottawa and the Montreal Shamrocks of the CHA in January 1910.

Motorsport

Rowing
The Boat Race
 3 April — Oxford wins the 66th Oxford and Cambridge Boat Race

Rugby league
International
 10 February — Great Britain defeats Australia to claim the first ever Ashes series in the final match of the 1908–09 Kangaroo tour of Great Britain
England
 Championship – Wigan
 Challenge Cup final – Wakefield Trinity 17–0 Hull F.C. at Headingley Rugby Stadium, Leeds
 Lancashire League Championship – Wigan
 Yorkshire League Championship – Halifax
 Lancashire County Cup – Wigan 10–9 Oldham   
 Yorkshire County Cup – Halifax 9–5 Hunslet 
Australia
 14 September — NSW Premiership is won by minor premiers South Sydney on a forfeit after Balmain withdraws from the grand final

Rugby union
Home Nations Championship
 27th Home Nations Championship series is won by Wales
 Wales defeats France in a 1909 non-championship match. It is later retrospectively regarded as a Grand Slam winner.
 October 8 – The first rugby football match to be played at Twickenham Stadium is won by the Harlequins when they defeat Richmond at the brand new ground.

Speed skating
Speed Skating World Championships
 Men's All-round Champion – Oscar Mathisen (Norway)

Tennis
Australia
 Australian Men's Singles Championship – Anthony Wilding (NZ) defeats Ernie Parker (Australia) 6–1 7–5 6–2
England
 Wimbledon Men's Singles Championship – Arthur Gore (GB) defeats Josiah Ritchie (GB) 6–8 1–6 6–2 6–2 6–2
 Wimbledon Women's Singles Championship – Dora Boothby (GB) defeats Agnes Morton (GB) 6–4 4–6 8–6 
France
 French Men's Singles Championship – Max Decugis (France) defeats Maurice Germot (France): details unknown
 French Women's Singles Championship – Jeanne Matthey (France) defeats Gallay (France): details unknown
USA
 American Men's Singles Championship – William Larned (USA) defeats William Clothier (USA) 6–1 6–2 5–7 1–6 6–1
 American Women's Singles Championship – Hazel Hotchkiss Wightman (USA) defeats Maud Barger-Wallach (USA) 6–0 6–1
Davis Cup
 1909 International Lawn Tennis Challenge –  5–0  at Double Bay Grounds (grass) Sydney, Australia

References

 
Sports by year